Mug Town is a 1942 Universal film starring the Dead End Kids and the Little Tough Guys.

Plot
Steve, Tommy, Pig, Ape, and String get chased out of town. During their attempt to hop onto a freight car, Steve dies. The other boys go and tell Alice, Steve's mother about what happened.  This leads to Tommy getting a job in the storage facility which she co-owns with Mack. Don, Steve's brother, also works there and Tommy learns that he is working for gangsters by informing them of when valuable items are available to be stolen. The other boys learn of Don's plans to make Tommy as the "fall-guy" during the next job and set about to stop him.

Cast

Dead End Kids and Little Tough Guys
 Billy Halop as Tommy Davis
 Huntz Hall as Pig
 Gabriel Dell as String
 Bernard Punsly as Ape

Additional cast
 Grace McDonald as Norene Steward
 Virginia Brissac as Mrs. Bell
 Tommy Kelly as Steve Bell
 Dick Hogan as Don Bell
 Jed Prouty as	Mack Steward

References

External links

1942 films
1942 crime films
American black-and-white films
American crime films
Universal Pictures films
Films directed by Ray Taylor
1940s English-language films
1940s American films